Isac Elliot Lundén (born 26 December 2000) is a Finnish-Swedish pop singer, songwriter, dancer and actor. He is best known for his song "New Way Home" and his debut album Wake Up World in 2013, both of which gained success in Finland and Norway. The follow-up album Follow Me was released in 2014 charting in Finland and Norway.

Music career

2012: Career beginnings
Elliot was a member of the boy choir Cantores Minores and appeared in the Svenska Teatern musicals Cabaret and Kristina från Duvemåla. His song "Pop Goes My Heart" was heard in the film Ella ja kaverit (2012).

2013–present: Wake Up World and Follow Me
Isac Elliot's debut single “New Way Home” was released on 14 February 2013.

In March 2013, he was included in the future stars section of Billboard'''s "Next Big Sound" list in the 11th place. The documentary Dream Big – The Movie about Elliot's career was released in cinemas on 14 February 2014.

Elliot's second studio album Follow Me was released on 7 November 2014. The album was recorded in Helsinki, London, Stockholm and Los Angeles with producers Jonas W. Karlsson, Axel Ehnström, Victor Thell and Kevin Högdahl. Following the release of Follow Me'', Elliot also embarked on a "Save a Girl" tour in the end of November 2014.

Personal life
Isac Elliot is Finland-Swedish. He is the son of Fredrik "Fredi" Lundén, the lead singer for the band The Capital Beat.

Discography

Studio albums

Extended plays

Singles

As lead artist

As featured artist

References

External links

 
 
 

2000 births
21st-century Finnish male singers
Finnish child singers
Living people
People from Kauniainen
Swedish-speaking Finns